The Medal "For Distinguished Labour" was a civilian labour award of the Soviet Union bestowed to especially deserving workers to recognise and honour high performances in labour or contributions in the fields of science, culture or the manufacturing industry.  In just over fifty years of existence, it was bestowed to over two million deserving citizens.  It was established on 27 December 1938 by decree of the Presidium of the Supreme Soviet of the USSR.  Its statute was amended three times by further decrees, firstly on 19 June 1943 to amend its description and ribbon, then on 16 December 1947 to amend its regulations, and finally on 18 July 1980 to confirm all previous amendments.  The medal ceased to be awarded following the December 1991 dissolution of the Soviet Union.

Medal statute
The Medal "For Distinguished Labour" was awarded to workers, farmers, specialists of the national economy, workers of science, culture, education, health and to other to citizens of the USSR, and in exceptional cases, to foreign nationals, for:
 an impact on work conducive to the growth of labour productivity and improvement in product quality, for achievements in the socialist competition;
 contribution to the construction or reconstruction of major economic projects;
 valuable innovations and rationalization proposals;
 successful work in the field of science, culture, literature, the arts, education, health, trade, catering, housing, utilities, public services, or in other areas of employment;
 active work in the communist education and training of young people, for success in public and social activities;
 achievements in the field of physical culture and sports.

The Medal "For Distinguished Labour" was worn on the left side of the chest and in the presence of other medals of the USSR, immediately after the Medal "For Labour Valour".  If worn in the presence of awards of the Russian Federation, the latter have precedence.

Medal description
The Medal "For Distinguished Labour" was a 32 mm in diameter circular medal struck from .925 silver with a raised rim on both sides. In the upper 3/4 of the obverse, a 21 mm high by 20 mm wide ruby-red enamelled image of the hammer and sickle over the relief inscription "USSR" in 3.5 mm high letters.  In the lower quarter of the obverse below the hammer and sickle, the sunken and red enamelled inscription on two rows "FOR DISTINGUISHED LABOUR" in 2 mm high letters.  On the otherwise plain reverse, the relief inscription on two rows of 2.5 mm high letters "LABOUR IN THE USSR - A MATTER OF HONOUR".  The medal was numbered until 1945.

Early awards hung from a small triangular mount covered with a red ribbon with a threaded stub and screw for attachment to clothing.  Following the 1943 decree, the Medal "For Labour Valour" was secured by a ring through the medal suspension loop to a standard Soviet pentagonal mount covered by a 24mm wide lilac coloured silk moiré ribbon with 2 mm wide yellow edge stripes.

Recipients (partial list)
The first investiture took place on 15 January 1939, when the Medal "For Distinguished Labour" was presented to 19 employees of the Kalinin armaments plant number 8 for exceptional service to the country in the creation and development of new weapons for the Workers' and Peasants' Red Army.

The individuals below were all recipients of the Medal "For Distinguished Labour".
 Composer, Hero of Socialist Labour, People's Artist of the USSR, Major General Boris Alexandrovich Alexandrov
 Football goalkeeper and Olympic medalist Vladimir Aleksandrovich Astapovsky
 Olympic basketball medalist Sergei Alexandrovich Belov
 Minister of Civil Aviation of the USSR, Hero of Socialist Labour, Chief Marshal of Aviation Boris Pavlovich Bugaev
 Women's World Chess Champion, first female Grandmaster, Nona Terent'evna Gaprindashvili
 Twice Hero of the Soviet Union cosmonaut Georgy Mikhaylovich Grechko
 Chief research fellow at the Zoological Institute of the Russian Science Academy Viktor Rafaelyevich Dolnik
 Ice dancer and coach Natalia Ilinichna Dubova
 Composer Aleksander Sergeyevich Zatsepin
 Mathematician and academician Alexey Grigorevich Ivakhnenko
 Ice hockey defenceman, Olympic medalist Alexei Viktorovich Kasatonov
 Composer, actor, and operatic tenor singer Abdylas Maldybaev
 Former ice hockey player and coach Viktor Vasilyevich Tikhonov
 Archaeologist and historian Svetlana Alexandrovna Pletneva
 Physicist and mathematician Sergey Pavlovich Kurdyumov
 Swimmer, Olympic medalist Yelena Kruglova
 Honoured Master of Sport Alexander Borisovich Kozhukhov
 Composer, People's Artist of the USSR Lyudmila Lyadova
 Playwright Kasymaly Jantöshev

See also
 Orders, decorations, and medals of the Soviet Union

References

External links
 Legal Library of the USSR
 The Russian Gazette

Civil awards and decorations of the Soviet Union
Awards established in 1938
Awards disestablished in 1991
1991 disestablishments in the Soviet Union
1938 establishments in the Soviet Union